Hubert Käppel (born 3 July 1951) is a German classical guitarist.

He teaches classical guitar at the Hochschule für Musik Köln in Germany. Guitars International states that "Hubert Kappel is among the most influential teachers and guitarists of his generation." Among his most successful students are Zoran Dukić, Goran Krivokapić, Laura Young, Marco Socias, Àlex Garrobé, Thomas Offerman, Petar Čulić.

He has performed internationally, both as a solo artist and as part of "Fénix - International Guitar Quartet" (Hubert Käppel, Sotiris Malasiotis (Greece), Luciano Marziali (Italy) and Piraí Vaca (Bolivia)). He has released several recordings  and music textbooks.

External links
Hubert Käppel Official site.
Discography at official site
http://www.guitarsint.com/bio.cfm/artistid/32 Guitars International: Biography of Hubert Käppel

1951 births
German classical guitarists
German male guitarists
Living people
Musicians from Cologne